Body Shock (also: Bodyshock) is a British medical documentary series about the conditions or lives of extraordinary people. It was originally produced by redback for Channel 4 in the UK, but in September 2006, it was taken over by ArkMedia.

There have been three series since December 2003.

 The Boy Who Gave Birth to His Twin (Alamjan Nematilaev from Kazakhstan)
 Wild Child (also titled Wild Child: The Story of Feral Children in the United States)
 Anatomy of a Shark Bite
 Riddle of the Elephant Man (Joseph Merrick from the United Kingdom)
 The Man Who Ate his Lover (Armin Meiwes from Germany)
 The Man Who Slept for 19 Years (Terry Wallis from the United States)
 Orgasmatron
 The Girl with X-Ray Eyes (Natasha Demkina from Saransk, Russia)
 Megatumour (Lucica Bunghez from Romania and Matt Peperell from England)
 When Anaesthesia Fails (Anesthetic awareness)
 The Curse of the Mermaid (Milagros Cerrón from Peru)
 Half Ton Man (Patrick Deuel from the United States)
 The 80-Year-old Children (The Hussein family from India)
 Born with Two Heads (Manar Maged from Egypt)
 The Boy in the Bubble (David Vetter from the United States)
 Kill Me to Cure Me (Brett Kehrer from the United States)
 World's Biggest Boy (Dzhambulat Khatokhov from Kabardino-Balkaria, Russia)
 Half Ton Mum
 The Girl with Eight Limbs (Lakshmi Tatma from Bihar, India)
 I am the Elephant Man (Huang Chuncai from China)
 The Girl with Two Faces (Lali Kumar from India)
 Half Ton Son (Billy Robbins from Houston, Texas, United States)
 Two Foot Tall Teen (Jyoti Amge, from Nagpur, India)
 Age 8 and Wanting a Sex Change
 The Girl Who Cries Blood (Twinkle Dwivedi from Lucknow, India)
 Our Daughter, the Mermaid (Shiloh Pepin from Maine)
 The Twins Who Share A Brain (Krista and Tatiana Hogan from Vernon, Canada)
 Dad's Having a Baby (Thomas and Scott Moore from California, US)
 The 27 Inch Man (Edwardo Hernandez)
 Turtle Boy
 World's Tallest Man (Sultan Kösen from Turkey)
 The Man with the 10-Stone Testicles (Wesley Warren, Jr. from the United States)
 The Girl who Never Ate (Tia McCarthy from the United Kingdom, who suffered from and received corrective surgery for Oesophageal atresia)

References

External links

2003 British television series debuts
2014 British television series endings
2000s British documentary television series
2010s British documentary television series
Channel 4 documentary series
English-language television shows